Mânzăleşti is a commune in the north of Buzău County, Muntenia, Romania. It is composed of thirteen villages: Beșlii, Buștea, Cireșu, Ghizdita, Gura Bădicului, Jghiab, Mânzălești, Plavățu, Poiana Vâlcului, Satu Vechi, Trestioara, Valea Cotoarei and Valea Ursului.

Location
Mânzălești is located in the hilly part of Buzău county, in the valley of the river Slănic, a tributary of the Buzău. Due to its location in a high-altitude region, the commune occupies a wide range of altitudes, from 400m in the Slănic river valley to 1,364m at the Cerdac peak.

Neighbours
 The commune of Vintileasca, Vrancea County, to the north
 The commune of Bisoca, to the east
 The communes of Chiliile, Cănești and Vintilă-Vodă to the south
 The commune of Lopătari to the east

History
The first document mentioning a village from the Mânzălești commune is a property act of February 3, 1522, by which the prince of Wallachia, Radu de la Afumaţi, gave ownership of the land of Peceneaga, from Menedic all the way to Cheia, to Negru Braga, his brothers and sons. The name Menedic refers to the present-day Meledic plateau, which lies close to the confluence of the Jgheab River and the Slănic River.

Throughout its medieval history, the commune was made up of several yeoman villages: Mânzălești-Mănești, Ciomagi, Răghinești and Ichimești, as well as the serf settlements on the Meledic and Poiana Ascunsă lands.

Landmarks
 The cave on the Meledic plateau, considered the longest cave carved in salt in the world.
 The Găvanu Eastern Orthodox monastery, dating back to the 18th century.
 The white mountain, a 13 meter high stone, showing wind and water erosion.

References

External links
 {http://primariaminzalesti.ro/ Commune website]

Communes in Buzău County
Localities in Muntenia